Love Outside the Window is the debut studio album by Italian singer and pianist Raphael Gualazzi. It was released in Italy through Edel Music on the 23 September 2005. The album reached number 44 on the Italian Albums Chart.

Track listing

Charts

Weekly charts

Release history

References

2005 albums
Raphael Gualazzi albums